Traymore was a station on the Port Authority of Allegheny County's light rail network, located in the Beechview neighborhood of Pittsburgh, Pennsylvania.  The street level stop was located in an especially hilly portion of the area known for its rolling terrain, providing access to commuters within walking distance via concrete stairs at the dead end of Traymore Avenue.

Traymore was one of eleven stops closed on June 25, 2012 as part of a system-wide consolidation effort.

References

External links 

Port Authority T Stations Listings

Former Port Authority of Allegheny County stations
Railway stations in the United States opened in 1987
Railway stations closed in 2012